Carson J. Bruns is a nanotechnologist, chemical engineer, and Assistant Professor of Mechanical Engineering at the University of Colorado.Bruns and his team at the University of Colorado, Boulder have developed a new type of tattoo ink that reacts to UV light. This type ink only becomes visible when the skin is exposed to excessive amounts of the sun's radiation.

Selected publications

Books
Bruns, Carson J., and J. Fraser Stoddart. "The nature of the mechanical bond: from molecules to machines." (2016).

Papers
Bruns, Carson J. "Moving forward in the semantic soup of artificial molecular machine taxonomy." Nature Nanotechnology (2022): 1-4.

References

Links
Futuristic tattoos that react to the world around you | Carson Bruns | TEDxMileHigh

American nanotechnologists